Kalcerrytus is a genus of spiders in the jumping spider family, Salticidae.

Species
 Kalcerrytus amapari Galiano, 2000 (Brazil)
 Kalcerrytus amplexus Bustamante & Ruiz, 2016
 Kalcerrytus carvalhoi (Bauab & Soares, 1978) (Brazil)
 Kalcerrytus chimore Galiano, 2000 (Bolivia)
 Kalcerrytus edwardsi Ruiz & Brescovit, 2003 (Brazil)
 Kalcerrytus excultus (Simon, 1902) (Brazil)
 Kalcerrytus falcatus Ruiz & Brescovit, 2003 (Brazil)
 Kalcerrytus filipi Bustamante & Ruiz, 2016
 Kalcerrytus kikkri Galiano, 2000 (French Guiana)
 Kalcerrytus leonardi Bustamante & Ruiz, 2016
 Kalcerrytus leucodon (Taczanowski, 1878) (Ecuador)
 Kalcerrytus limoncocha Galiano, 2000 (Ecuador)
 Kalcerrytus mberuguarus Ruiz & Brescovit, 2003 (Brazil)
 Kalcerrytus merretti Galiano, 2000 (Brazil)
 Kalcerrytus nauticus Galiano, 2000 (Brazil)
 Kalcerrytus odontophorus Ruiz & Brescovit, 2003 (Brazil)
 Kalcerrytus rosamariae Ruiz & Brescovit, 2003 (Brazil)
 Kalcerrytus salsicha Ruiz & Brescovit, 2003 (Brazil)

References
  (2000). Descripción de Kalcerrytus, nuevo género (Araneae, Salticidae). Physis B. Aires (C) 132-133: 53-71.

External links
 Photographs of Kalcerrytus species from Brazil

Salticidae genera
Spiders of South America
Salticidae